Gevorg VI of Armenia (Kevork VI Cheorekjian; December 2, 1868 – May 9, 1954) was the Catholicos of the Armenian Apostolic Church from 1945 to 1954.

The position had remained vacant from 1938 to 1945 following the Stalinist-era purges against organized religion, culminating in the murder of the then catholicos Khoren I in 1938. Ejmiatsin was ordered closed and the position of Catholicos of All Armenians remained vacant for seven years.

But when Stalin himself ordered the easing of restrictions against religion, it was allowed for the assignment of Bishop Gevorg as the new Catholicos of All Armenians as Gevorg VI (also known as Gevorg VI of Armenia) and was eventually allowed to return to Ejmiatsin.
 
During the Soviet regime, the press praised Gevorg as one of the most outstanding supporters of the "struggle for peace."

He died in 1954, and was succeeded by Vazgen I, who was elected in 1955 as Catholicos of All Armenians.

Gevorg VI is buried near the Mother Cathedral of Holy Ejmiatsin.

References

1868 births
1954 deaths
People from Rostov-on-Don
People from Don Host Oblast
Russian people of Armenian descent
Catholicoi of Armenia
Armenian Oriental Orthodox Christians